Winter Symphony is  the fourth album release from Jennifer Thomas, and her first Christmas album. The music was written and/or arranged by Thomas, with orchestrations by Glen Gabriel. Thomas performs on both piano and violin throughout. Also featured on the album is The Ensign Chorus, Felicia Farerre, Taylor Davis, and players from The Salt Lake Pops Orchestra, The Utah Symphony, and the Chochin Chamber Orchestra. The album encompasses many traditional Christmas favorites, two new originals by Thomas, as well as some film score covers. Mixed by Brian Vibberts, contributors included Ricky Kej and Taylor Davis

Track listing

Credits 

 Jennifer Thomas – producer, songwriter, arranger
 Glen Gabriel – producer, orchestration
 Brian Vibberts – orchestration
 Christofer Stannow – mastering

References 

2015 albums